Fear of fish or ichthyophobia ranges from cultural phenomena such as fear of eating fish, fear of touching raw fish, or fear of dead fish, up to irrational fear (specific phobia). Selachophobia, or galeophobia, is the specific fear of sharks.

Etymology
The term ichthyophobia comes from the Greek ἰχθῦς - ichthus, meaning "fish" and φόβος - phobos, "fear". Galeophobia comes from the Greek γαλεός - galeos, "small shark".

Phobia
Ichthyophobia is described in Psychology: An International Perspective as an "unusual" specific phobia.  Both symptoms and remedies of ichthyophobia are common to most specific phobias.

American psychologist John B. Watson, a renowned name in behaviorism, describes an example, quoted in many books in psychology, of conditioned fear of a goldfish in an infant and a way of unconditioning of the fear by what is now called  graduated exposure therapy:

In contrast, radical exposure therapy was used successfully to cure a man with a "life affecting" fish phobia on the 2007 documentary series, The Panic Room.

Cultural phenomenon
Historically, the Navajo people were described as being ichthyophobic, due to their aversion to fish. However, this was later recognised as a cultural or mythic aversion to aquatic animals, and not a psychological condition.

Fear of eating fish
The Journal of the American Medical Association have published a research paper addressing the fears of eating fish among those who are concerned about contaminants, such as mercury, becoming accumulated in their food.

See also 

List of phobias

References 

Zoophobias
Fish and humans